The Harnden–Browne House is a historic house at 60-62 Salem Street in Reading, Massachusetts, exemplifying the adaptation of older buildings to new architectural styles.  The -story wood-frame house was built in 1831 by Sylvester Harnden, likely in a Georgian-Federal vernacular style.  Later in the 19th century it was restyled with some Queen Anne details, and converted to a boarding house.  In 1928 it was owned by Thomas Browne, an Irish immigrant who first roomed in the house.

The house was listed on the National Register of Historic Places in 1985.

See also
National Register of Historic Places listings in Reading, Massachusetts
National Register of Historic Places listings in Middlesex County, Massachusetts

References

Houses on the National Register of Historic Places in Reading, Massachusetts
Houses in Reading, Massachusetts
Houses completed in 1831